In mathematics, the Lerch zeta function, sometimes called the Hurwitz–Lerch zeta function, is a special function that generalizes the Hurwitz zeta function and the polylogarithm.  It is named after Czech mathematician Mathias Lerch, who published a paper about the function in 1887.

Definition
The Lerch zeta function is given by

A related function, the Lerch transcendent, is given by

The two are related, as

Integral representations

The Lerch transcendent has an integral representation:

The proof is based on using the integral definition of the Gamma function to write

and then interchanging the sum and integral. The resulting integral representation converges for  Re(s) > 0, and Re(a) > 0. This analytically continues  to z outside the unit disk. The integral formula also holds if z = 1, Re(s) > 1, and Re(a) > 0; see Hurwitz zeta function.

A contour integral representation is given by

where C is a Hankel contour counterclockwise around the positive real axis, not enclosing any of the points  (for integer k) which are poles of the integrand. The integral assumes Re(a) > 0.

Other integral representations

A Hermite-like integral representation is given by

for

and

for

Similar representations include

and

holding for positive z (and more generally wherever the integrals converge). Furthermore,

The last formula is also known as Lipschitz formula.

Special cases
The Lerch zeta function and Lerch transcendent generalize various special functions.

The Hurwitz zeta function is the special case

The polylogarithm is another special case:

The Riemann zeta function is a special case of both of the above:

Other special cases include:
 The Dirichlet eta function:

 The Dirichlet beta function:

 The Legendre chi function:

 The Polygamma function:

Identities
For λ rational, the summand is a root of unity, and thus   may be expressed as a finite sum over the Hurwitz zeta function.

Various identities include:

and

and

Series representations
A series representation for the Lerch transcendent is given by

(Note that  is a binomial coefficient.)

The series is valid for all s, and for complex z with Re(z)<1/2. Note a general resemblance to a similar series representation for the Hurwitz zeta function.

A Taylor series in the first parameter was given by Erdélyi. It may be written as the following series, which is valid for

If n is a positive integer, then

where  is the digamma function.

A Taylor series in the third variable is given by

where  is the Pochhammer symbol.

Series at a = −n is given by

A special case for n = 0 has the following series

where  is the polylogarithm.

An asymptotic series for 

for 
and

for 

An asymptotic series in the incomplete gamma function

for 

The representation as a generalized hypergeometric function is

Asymptotic expansion 
The polylogarithm function  is defined as

Let

Let

Software
The Lerch transcendent is implemented as LerchPhi in Maple and Mathematica, and as lerchphi in mpmath and SymPy.

References

 .
 . (See § 1.11, "The function Ψ(z,s,v)", p. 27)
 
 . (Includes various basic identities in the introduction.)
 .
 .
 .

External links
 .
 Ramunas Garunkstis, Home Page (2005) (Provides numerous references and preprints.)
 
  
 
 

Zeta and L-functions